Jacob Schram may refer to:

 Jacob Schram (1870–1952), Norwegian businessperson
 Jacob Schram (businessman), CEO of Norwegian Air Shuttle
 Jacob Schram, original owner of Schramsberg Vineyards, a winery in Napa Valley, California
 Rabbi Jacob Schram, a fictional character in the film Keeping the Faith